Pigeonhole or pigeon hole may refer to:

Pigeonholes, nesting spaces in a dovecote
Pigeonhole, one of the boxes in a pigeon coop
Pigeonholing, classifying things into categories
Pigeonhole principle, a mathematical principle
Pigeonhole sort, a sorting algorithm
Pigeon-hole messagebox, a communication method
Pigeonhole (album), by the band New Fast Automatic Daffodils
Pigeon Hole (band), a Canadian hip hop duo
 Pigeon Hole Station, once part of Victoria River Downs Station, Northern Territory, Australia